Madyes (Ancient Greek: ,;) was a Scythian king who ruled during the period of the Scythian presence in West Asia in the 7th century BCE. Madyes was the son of the Scythian king Bartatua and the Assyrian princess Serua-eterat, and, as an ally of the Neo-Assyrian Empire, which was then the superpower of West Asia and whose king Ashurbanipal was his uncle, he brought Scythian power to its peak in West Asia.

After the Neo-Assyrian Empire started unravelling, Madyes was assassinated by the Median king Cyaxares, who expelled the Scythians from West Asia.

Name
The Iranologist Rüdiger Schmitt suggested the original form of Madyes's name was Scythian , meaning “intoxicating drink,” although the scholar , noting that this reconstruction was unlikely because the Proto-Scythian sound /δ/ had evolved into /l/ in Scythian, and that the name of this king was transmitted through Persian sources to the Greek authors who recorded it, proposed that the name  instead originated from a Western Iranian form , meaning “Median.”

Historical background

In the 8th and 7th centuries BCE, a significant movement of the nomads of the Eurasian steppe brought the Scythians into Southwest Asia. This movement started when another nomadic Iranian tribe closely related to the Scythians, either the Massagetae or the Issedones, migrated westwards, forcing the Early Scythians of the to the west across the Araxes river, following which the Scythians moved into the Caspian Steppe from where they displaced the Cimmerians.

Under Scythian pressure, the Cimmerians migrated to the south along the coast of the Black Sea and reached Anatolia, and the Scythians in turn later expanded to the south, following the coast of the Caspian Sea and arrived in the steppes in the Northern Caucasus, from where they expanded into the region of present-day Azerbaijan, where they settled and turned eastern Transcaucasia into their centre of operations in West Asia until the early 6th century BCE, with this presence in West Asia being an extension of the Scythian kingdom of the steppes. During this period, the Scythian kings' headquarters were located in the steppes to the north of Caucasus, and contact with the civilisation of West Asia would have an important influence on the formation of Scythian culture.

Life and reign

Background
Madyes was the son of the previous Scythian king, Bartatua, and possibly the grandson of Bartatua's predecessor, Išpakaia. Išpakaia had been an enemy of the then superpower in West Asia, the Neo-Assyrian Empire, and was killed in battle against the Assyrian king Esarhaddon, after which Bartatua became the king of the Scythians and instead sought to ally with the Assyrians.

The name of Madyes's mother is not recorded, but, since Bartatua had asked in marriage the hand of the Assyrian princess Serua-eterat, who was the daughter of Esarhaddon and the sister of his successors Ashurbanipal and Shamash-shum-ukin, and there was a close alliance between the Scythians and Assyria under the reigns of Bartatua and Madyes, this suggests that the Assyrian priests did approve of this marriage between a daughter of an Assyrian king and a nomadic lord, which had never happened before in Assyrian history; the Scythians were thus brought into a marital alliance with Assyria, and Serua-eterat was likely the mother of Bartatua's son Madyes.

Bartatua's marriage to Serua-eterat required that he would pledge allegiance to Assyria as a vassal, and in accordance to Assyrian law, the territories ruled by him would be his fief granted by the Assyrian king, which made the Scythian presence in West Asia a nominal extension of the Neo-Assyrian Empire. Under this arrangement, the power of the Scythians in West Asia heavily depended on their cooperation with the Assyrian Empire; henceforth, the Scythians remained allies of the Assyrian Empire. Around this time, the Urartian king Rusa II might also have enlisted Scythian troops to guard his western borderlands.

The marital alliance between the Scythian king and the Assyrian ruling dynasty, as well as the proximity of the Scythians with Mannai and Urartu, placed the Scythians under the strong influence of Assyrian culture.

After Bartatua's death, Madyes succeeded him.

Conquest of Media
When, following a period of Assyrian decline over the course of the 650s BCE, Esarhaddon's other son, Shamash-shum-ukin, who had succeeded him as the king of Babylon, revolted against his brother Ashurbanipal in 652 BCE, the Medes supported him, and Madyes helped Ashurbanipal suppress the revolt externally by invading the Medes. The Median king Phraortes was killed in battle, either against the Assyrians or against Madyes himself, who then imposed Scythian hegemony over Media for twenty-eight years on behalf of the Assyrians, thus starting a period which Greek authors called the “Scythian rule over Asia.”

Madyes soon expanded the Scythian hegemony to the state of Urartu as well, with Media, Mannai and Urartu all continuing to exist as kingdoms under Scythian suzerainty.

Defeat of the Cimmerians
During the 7th century BCE, the bulk of Cimmerians were operating in Anatolia, where they constituted a threat against the Scythians’ Assyrian allies, who since 669 BCE were ruled by Madyes's uncle, that is Esarhaddon's son and Serua-eterat's brother, Ashurbanipal. Assyrian records in 657 BCE might have referred to a threat against or a conquest of the western possessions of the Neo-Assyrian Empire in Syria, and these Cimmerian aggressions worried Ashurbanipal about the security of his empire's north-west border. This situation continued throughout the rest of the 650s BCE and the early 640s BCE.

In 644 BCE, the Cimmerians, led by Tugdammi, attacked the kingdom of Lydia, defeated the Lydians and captured the Lydian capital, Sardis; the Lydian king Gyges died during this attack. After sacking Sardis, Tugdammi led the Cimmerians into invading the Greek city-states of Ionia and Aeolis on the western coast of Anatolia. After this attack on Lydia and the Asian Greek cities, around 640 BCE the Cimmerians moved to Cilicia on the north-west border of the Neo-Assyrian empire, where, after Tugdammi faced a revolt against himself, he allied with Assyria and acknowledged Assyrian overlordship, and sent tribute to Ashurbanipal, to whom he swore an oath. Tugdammi soon broke this oath and attacked the Neo-Assyrian Empire again, but he fell ill and died in 640 BCE, and was succeeded by his son Sandakšatru.

In 637 BCE, the Thracian Treres tribe who had migrated across the Thracian Bosporos and invaded Anatolia, under their king Kōbos and in alliance with Sandakšatru's Cimmerians and the Lycians, attacked Lydia during the seventh year of the reign of Gyges's son Ardys. They defeated the Lydians and captured their capital of Sardis except for its citadel, and Ardys might have been killed in this attack. Ardys's son and successor, Sadyattes, might possibly also have been killed in another Cimmerian attack on Lydia in 635 BCE.

Soon after 635 BCE, with Assyrian approval and in alliance with the Lydians, the Scythians under Madyes entered Anatolia, expelled the Treres from Asia Minor, and defeated the Cimmerians so that they no longer constituted a threat again, following which the Scythians extended their domination to Central Anatolia. This final defeat of the Cimmerians was carried out by the joint forces of Madyes, who Strabo credits with expelling the Cimmerians from Asia Minor, and of the son of Sadyattes and the great-grandson of Gyges, the Lydian king Alyattes, whom Herodotus of Halicarnassus and Polyaenus claim finally defeated the Cimmerians.

Scythian power in West Asia thus reached its peak under Madyes, with the territories ruled by the Scythians extending from the Halys river in Anatolia in the west to the Caspian Sea and the eastern borders of Media in the east, and from Transcaucasia in the north to the northern borders of the Neo-Assyrian Empire in the south.

Revolt of Media and death
By the 620s BCE, the Neo-Assyrian Empire began unravelling after the death of Ashurbanipal in 631 BCE: in addition to internal instability within Assyria itself, Babylon revolted against the Assyrians in 626 BCE under the leadership of Nabopolassar. The next year, in 625 BCE, Cyaxares, the son of Phraortes and his successor to the Median kingship, overthrew the Scythian yoke over the Medes by inviting the Scythian rulers to a banquet and then murdering them all, including Madyes, after getting them drunk.

Aftermath
Madyes's relationship with the Scythian kings after him and the identity of his successor are both unknown, although shortly after his assassination, some time between 623 and 616 BCE, the Scythians took advantage of the power vacuum created by the crumbling of the power of their former Assyrian allies and overran the Levant and reached as far south as Palestine till the borders of Egypt, where their advance was stopped by the marshes of the Nile Delta, after which the pharaoh Psamtik I met them and convinced them to turn back by offering them gifts.

According to Babylonian records, around 615 BCE the Scythians were operating as allies of Cyaxares and the Medes in their war against Assyria. The Scythians were finally expelled from West Asia by the Medes in the 600s BCE, after which they retreated into the Pontic Steppe.

Legacy
Graeco-Roman authors confused Madyes with his predecessors and successors into a single figure, also named Madyes, who led Scythians into defeating the Medes and the legendary Egyptian king Sesostris and imposing their rule over Asia for many years before returning to Scythia. Later Graeco-Roman authors named this Scythian king as Idanthyrsos or Tanausis, although this Idanthyrsos is a legendary figure separate from the later historical Scythian king Idanthyrsus, from whom the Graeco-Romans derived merely his name.

References

Sources

 
 
 
 
 
 
 
 
 
 
 
 
 
 
 
  
 
 
 
 
 

|-

Scythian rulers
7th-century BC deaths
Year of birth unknown
7th-century BC rulers in Asia